Chrysopilus andersoni is a species of snipe fly in the family Rhagionidae.

Distribution
United States

References

Rhagionidae
Insects described in 1930
Diptera of North America